The chancellor was a semi-formally designated office position for a number of high-level officials at one time during the Tang dynasty of China. This list also includes chancellors of the short-lived Wu Zhou dynasty, which is typically treated as an interregnum of the Tang dynasty by historians.

Origins 
Ouyang Xiu, the author of the New Book of Tang, asserts that the Tang dynasty inherited its bureaucracy from its dynastic predecessor, the Sui dynasty, under which the founder Emperor Wen of Sui divided his government into five main bureaus:

 Shàngshūshěng (尚書省) – The Department of State Affairs
 Ménxiàshěng (門下省) – The Chancellery
 Nèishǐshěng (內史省) – The Legislative Bureau (note different tone than the eunuch bureau below)
 Mìshūshěng (秘書省) – The Palace Library
 Nèishìshěng (內侍省) – The Eunuch bureau (note different tone than the legislative bureau above), later changed by Emperor Wen's son Emperor Yang of Sui to Diànnèishěng (殿內省)

Under Emperor Wen, the executive bureau was regarded as the most important, and he had his most honored officials such as Gao Jiong, Yang Su, and Su Wei lead it at various points. Its heads were generally regarded as chancellors (as it always had two heads, known as the Shàngshūpúshè (尚書僕射)). Ouyang asserts, however, that the heads of the examination and legislative bureaus were also considered chancellors.

Organization

Early history
The Tang dynasty founder Emperor Gaozu initially followed the Sui's system of governance, including the five-bureau organization. However, he deviated from his predecessors by creating a single head for the executive bureau, known as the Shàngshūlǐng (尚書令) and appointed the office to his second son and future emperor Lǐ Shìmín (李世民). After Li Shimin became emperor in 626, the office was left vacant because none of his officials dared to occupy it. Thus from the year 626 the executive bureau was headed by its two vice-directors, the Shàngshūpúshè. Around this time, probably by Emperor Taizong's orders, the institution of multiple chancellors was formalized, with the heads of the executive, examination, and legislative (which was renamed the Zhōngshūshěng (中書省)) bureaus regarded as the chancellors. As there were often, but not always, more than one head for the examination and legislative bureaus, there were not necessarily only four chancellors. Emperor Taizong's reign also began to designate certain high-level officials, even though they were not heads of one of the bureaus, as chancellors, with titles such as Cānyù Cháozhèng (參豫朝政, literally "participator in the administration's governance"). Yet later in 643, he revised the designation and formalized it as the Tóngzhōngshūménxiàsānpǐn (同中書門下三品, literally meaning "equivalent to the officials with the third rank from the Zhōngshū and the Ménxià") — because the heads of the legislative bureau, the Zhōngshūlǐng (中書令), and the examination bureau, the Shìzhōng (侍中), were of the third rank. These officials were rendered as "chancellors de facto'" Shízhìzǎixiàng (實質宰相) by the Chinese historian Bo Yang in his modern Chinese edition of the Zizhi Tongjian.

Name changes
Throughout Tang history, the names of the examination and legislative bureaus were changed multiple times, and so the designation of Tóngzhōngshū Ménxià Sānpǐn was frequently changed in response thereof. For example, during the reign of Emperor Xuanzong, when the legislative bureau was briefly known as the Zǐwéishěng (紫微省) and the examination bureau the Huángménshěng (黃門省), the chancellors de facto were known as the Tóng Zǐwéi Huángmén Sānpǐn. A lesser designation, with the same powers, was created in 682 during the reign of Emperor Gaozong, and was initially known as the Tóng Zhōngshū Ménxià Píngzhāngshì (同中書門下平章事, literally "equivalent to the participators from the Zhōngshū and the Ménxià"), rendered by Bo as "chancellors de facto second grade." Later in Tang history, after the Anshi Rebellion, while the chancellor-de facto designation was not officially abolished, it was no longer in use, as the last chancellor to be designated as such was Li Lin, in 757–758, and the chancellor-de facto-of-second-grade designation became very common and was used for the rest of Tang history. Furthermore, after 705, the heads of the executive bureau were no longer considered chancellors unless they received the chancellor-de facto designation of either kind. Throughout the early dynasty until the second reign of Emperor Ruizong in 710, variations of the Canyu Chaozheng also continued appearing, including Canzhi Jiwu (參知機務, literally "participator in important matters"), Canzhang Jimi (參掌機密, literally "participator in national secret matters"), Canzhi Zhengshi (參知政事, literally "participator in governance matters"), Canmou Zhengshi (參謀政事, similarly in meaning to Canzhi Zhengshi) also appeared, which Bo rendered as "chancellors de facto of the third class."

Function
The chancellors periodically met together at the Zhengshi Tang (政事堂, literally "the Hall of State Matters"), originally physically located within the examination bureau. In 683, when Pei Yan, then the head of the examination bureau, became the head of the legislative bureau, the Zhengshi Tang was moved from the examination bureau to the legislative bureau. Later, during Emperor Xuanzong's reign, when Zhang Shuo became chancellor, he changed the name to Zhongshu Menxia (中書門下), apparently employing a double entendre, as when the terms were put together, they meant, "within the doors of the Zhongshu." Zhang also reorganized the Hall by creating five offices under the chancellors—in charge of civil service, state secrets, military matters, governance, and criminal law, respectively. Later in the dynasty—starting during the reign of Emperor Suzong — the chancellors begin to rotate off-days so that at least one would always be on duty; when submissions were to be made to the emperor, they were signed in the names of all chancellors, whether on duty or not. The name of their meeting place also changed back to Zhengshi Tang.

List of Tang chancellors 
This list also includes the chancellors during the Wu Zhou dynasty of Wu Zetian, even though the propriety of considering it as part of the Tang dynasty is disputed. The list does not include people who served as regional governors who were given the titles as honorific titles. The chancellors under the pretenders Li Yun and Li Yu, Prince of De are listed, but not the chancellors under the pretender Li Chenghong because, while Li Chenghong was described to have multiple chancellors, only two (Yu Kefeng (于可封) and Huo Huan (霍環)) was named in historical accounts, and Yu and Huo's actual titles were not given in those accounts.

Heads of the Executive Bureau 
The executive bureau had these changes in name:

 Shangshu Sheng (尚書省) (618–662)
 Zhong Tai (中臺) (662–670)
 Shangshu Sheng (670–684)
 Wenchang Tai (文昌臺) (684)
 Wenchang Dusheng (文昌都省) (684–685)
 Wenchang Dutai (文昌都臺) (685–703)
 Zhong Tai (703–705)
 Shangshu Sheng (705–907)

Correspondingly, the heads of the executive bureau, considered chancellors from 618 to 705, had these titles during those periods:

 Shangshu Ling (尚書令) (618–626)
 Shangshu Puye (尚書僕射) (618–662)
 Kuangzheng (匡政) (662–670)
 Shangshu Puye (670–684)
 Wenchang Xiang (文昌相) (684–705)
 Shangshu Puye (705–713)
 Cheng Xiang (丞相) (713–742)
 Shangshu Puye (742–907)

The men who held the office included (including the Shangshu Puye during Emperor Gaozu's reign, even though at that time the office was for the deputy heads of the Shangshu Sheng):

 Li Shimin (as Shangshu Ling 618–626)
 Pei Ji (618–629)
 Xiao Yu (623–626, 627)
 Feng Deyi (626–627)
 Zhangsun Wuji (627–628)
 Fang Xuanling (629–643, 643–648)
 Du Ruhui (629)
 Li Jing (630–634)
 Wen Yanbo (636–637)
 Gao Shilian (638–643)
 Li Shiji (649–650)
 Zhang Xingcheng (651–653)
 Yu Zhining (651–659)
 Chu Suiliang (653–655)
 Liu Rengui (675–681, 683–685)
 Dai Zhide (675–679)
 Su Liangsi (686–690)
 Wei Daijia (686–689)
 Wu Chengsi (690–692)
 Cen Changqian (690–691)
 Doulu Qinwang (697–698, 699–700, 705–706)
 Wang Jishan (699)

After 705, the heads of the executive bureau were no longer considered chancellors unless they received the chancellor-de facto designation.

 Tang Xiujing (705–706)
 Wei Yuanzhong (706–707)
 Li Chengqi (710)
 Li Kuo (763–764) (as Shangshu Ling)
 Guo Ziyi (764) (as Shangshu Ling)
 Li Maozhen (901–903) (as Shangshu Ling)

Heads of the Legislative Bureau 
The leiglsative bureau had these changes in name:

 Neishi Sheng (內史省) (618–620)
 Zhongshu Sheng (中書省) (620–662)
 Xi Tai (西臺) (662–671)
 Zhongshu Sheng (671–684)
 Feng Ge (鳳閣) (684–705)
 Zhongshu Sheng (705–713)
 Ziwei Sheng (紫微省) (713–717)
 Zhongshu Sheng (717–907)

Correspondingly, the heads of the legislative bureau had these titles during those periods:

 Neishi Ling (內史令) (618–620)
 Zhongshu Ling (中書令) (620–662)
 You Xiang (右相) (662–671)
 Zhongshu Ling (671–684)
 Neishi (內史) (684–705)
 Zhongshu Ling (705–713)
 Ziwei Ling (紫微令) (713–717)
 Zhongshu Ling (717–742)
 You Xiang (742–757)
 Zhongshu Ling (757–907)

The men who held the office included:
 Xiao Yu (618–623)
 Dou Wei (618)
 Feng Deyi (620–626)
 Yang Gongren (623–626)
 Li Shimin (625–626)
 Fang Xuanling (626–629)
 Yuwen Shiji (626–627)
 Li Jing (628–630)
 Wen Yanbo (630–636)
 Yang Shidao (639–643, 645)
 Cen Wenben (644–645)
 Ma Zhou (644–648)
 Zhangsun Wuji (648–649)
 Chu Suiliang (648–650)
 Gao Jifu (649–651)
 Liu Shi (652–654)
 Lai Ji (655–657)
 Cui Dunli (655–656)
 Li Yifu (657–658, 663)
 Du Zhenglun (657–658)
 Xu Jingzong (658–662)
 Liu Xiangdao (664)
 Lu Dunxin (665–666)
 Liu Rengui (666–670)
 Yan Liben (668–673)
 Hao Chujun (675–679)
 Li Jingxuan (676–680)
 Xue Yuanchao (681–683)
 Cui Zhiwen (681–683)
 Pei Yan (683–684)
 Qian Weidao (684–685)
 Pei Judao (685–687)
 Cen Changqian (686–690)
 Xing Wenwei (690)
 Doulu Qinwang (693–694)
 Li Zhaode (694)
 Wang Jishan (697–699)
 Wu Sansi (698–700)
 Di Renjie (700)
 Li Jiao (704, 706–709)
 Yang Zaisi (704–705, 705–709)
 Cui Xuanwei (705)
 Yuan Shuji (705)
 Wei Anshi (705–706, 711)
 Wei Yuanzhong (705–706)
 Zong Chuke (709–710)
 Xiao Zhizhong (709–710, 710, 713)
 Zhong Shaojing (710)
 Wei Sili (710)
 Yao Chong (710–711, 713–716)
 Cui Shi (712–713)
 Zhang Shuo (713, 723–726)
 Zhang Jiazhen (720–723)
 Xiao Song (729–733)
 Zhang Jiuling (733–736)
 Li Linfu (736–752)
 Yang Guozhong (752–756)
 Cui Yuan (757–758)
 Li Fuguo (762)
 Li Huaiguang (783–784)
 Li Sheng (784–793)
 Hun Jian (796–799)
 Han Hong (819–822)
 Pei Du (839)
 Bai Minzhong (860–861)
 Wei Zhaodu (888)

Heads of the Examination Bureau 
The examination bureau had these changes in name:

 Menxia Sheng (門下省) (618–662)
 Dong Tai (東臺) (662–671)
 Menxia Sheng (671–684)
 Luan Tai (鸞臺) (684–705)
 Menxia Sheng (705–713)
 Huangmen Sheng (黃門省) (713–720)
 Menxia Sheng (720–907)

Correspondingly, the heads of the examination bureau had these titles during those periods:

 Nayan (納言) (618–620)
 Shizhong (侍中) (620–662)
 Zuo Xiang (左相) (662–671)
 Shizhong (671–684)
 Nayan (684–705)
 Shizhong (705–713)
 Huangmen Jian (黃門監) (713–720)
 Shizhong (720–742)
 Zuo Xiang (742–757)
 Shizhong (757–907)

The men who held the office included:
 Liu Wenjing (618)
 Dou Kang (618)
 Chen Shuda (618–626)
 Pei Ju (624–625)
 Yuwen Shiji (625–626)
 Li Yuanji (625–626)
 Gao Shilian (626–627)
 Du Ruhui (628–629)
 Wang Gui (628–633)
 Wei Zheng (632–636)
 Yang Shidao (636–639)
 Liu Ji (644–645)
 Zhangsun Wuji (645–648)
 Zhang Xingcheng (650–651)
 Gao Jifu (651–654)
 Yuwen Jie (652–653)
 Cui Dunli (653–655)
 Han Yuan (655–657)
 Xu Jingzong (657–658)
 Xin Maojiang (658–659)
 Xu Yushi (659–662)
 Dou Dexuan (664–666)
 Jiang Ke (668–672)
 Zhang Wenguan (675–678)
 Hao Chujun (679–681)
 Pei Yan (681–683)
 Liu Jingxian (683–684)
 Wang Dezhen (684–685)
 Su Liangsi (685–686)
 Wei Siqian (686–687)
 Pei Judao (687–690)
 Wei Xuantong (687–689)
 Zhang Guangfu (689)
 Wu Chengsi (689–690)
 Wu Youning (690–691, 691–692)
 Shi Wuzi (690–691)
 Zong Qinke (690)
 Ouyang Tong (691)
 Yao Shu (694–697)
 Lou Shide (697–699)
 Di Renjie (698–700)
 Li Jiao (703–704)
 Wei Anshi (704–705, 709–710)
 Jing Hui (705)
 Huan Yanfan (705)
 Wei Yuanzhong (705)
 Yang Zaisi (705–707)
 Su Gui (706–707)
 Wei Juyuan (707–709)
 Ji Chuna (707–710)
 Xiao Zhizhong (709)
 Li Rizhi (711)
 Dou Huaizhen (711)
 Liu Youqiu (711–712, 713)
 Cen Xi (712–713)
 Wei Zhigu (713–714)
 Lu Huaishen (714–716)
 Song Jing (716–720)
 Yuan Qianyao (720–729)
 Pei Guangting (730–733)
 Pei Yaoqing (734–736)
 Niu Xianke (738–742)
 Li Shizhi (742–746)
 Chen Xilie (747–754)
 Wei Jiansu (756–757)
 Miao Jinqing (757, 757–763)
 Wang Jin (764)
 Hun Jian (784–796)
 Ma Sui (785–795)
 Wang Duo (881–882)
 Zhu Mei (886)
 Zheng Congdang (886–887)
 Wei Zhaodu (887–888)
 Xu Yanruo (896–900)
 Cui Yin (903–904)

Chancellors de facto

Prior to formalization 
 Du Yan (627–628) (as Canyu Chaozheng (參豫朝政))
 Wei Zheng (629–632 (as Canyu Chaozheng), 636–642 (as Canyi Deshi (參議得失)))
 Xiao Yu (630 (as Canyi Chaozheng (參議朝政)), 635–636 (as Canyu Chaozheng))
 Dai Zhou (630–633) (as Canyu Chaozheng)
 Hou Junji (630–632, 632–643) (as Canyu Chaozheng)
 Li Jing (634) (as Pingzhang Zhengshi (平章政事))
 Liu Ji (639–644) (as Canzhi Zhengshi (參知政事))
 Cen Wenben (642–644) (as Zhuandian Jimi (專典機密))

 Chancellors de facto of the first grade 
The office was created in 643. The titles, as modified from time to time to reflect the names in changes of the legislative and examination bureaus, included:

 Tong Zhongshu Menxia Sanpin (同中書門下三品) (643–662)
 Tong Dong Xi Tai Sanpin (同東西臺三品) (662–672)
 Tong Zhongshu Menxia Sanpin (672–684)
 Tong Fengge Luantai Sanpin (同鳳閣鸞臺三品) (684–705)
 Tong Zhongshu Menxia Sanpin (705–713)
 Tong Ziwei Huangmen Sanpin (同紫微黃門三品) (713–720)
 Tong Zhongshu Menxia Sanpin (720–738)
 Xiao Yu (643–646)
 Li Shiji (643–649, 650–670)
 Gao Shilian (643–647)
 Zhangsun Wuji (649–659)
 Yuwen Jie (651–652)
 Liu Shi (651–652)
 Gao Jifu (651–653)
 Yu Zhining (651–659)
 Chu Suiliang (652–655)
 Han Yuan (652–655)
 Lai Ji (652–655)
 Du Zhenglun (656–657)
 Cui Dunli (656)
 Xu Yushi (659)
 Ren Yaxiang (659–662)
 Li Yifu (659–662, 662–663)
 Lu Chengqing (659–660)
 Xu Jingzong (662–670)
 Shangguan Yi (662–665)
 Le Yanwei (665)
 Sun Chuyue (665)
 Jiang Ke (665–668)
 Yang Hongwu (667–668)
 Dai Zhide (667–675)
 Li Anqi (667)
 Zhao Renben (667–670)
 Zhang Wenguan (669–678)
 Li Jingxuan (669–670, 670–676)
 Hao Chujun (669–679)
 Liu Rengui (672–675, 681–683)
 Lai Heng (676–678)
 Xue Yuanchao (676–681)
 Li Yiyan (676–683)
 Gao Zhizhou (676–679)
 Zhang Da'an (677–680)
 Wang Dezhen (680)
 Pei Yan (680–681)
 Cui Zhiwen (680–681)
 Cen Changqian (683–686, 690–691)
 Guo Daiju (683–684)
 Wei Xuantong (683–687)
 Wei Hongmin (684)
 Liu Yizhi (684–687)
 Wu Chengsi (684, 685, 690–692, 697)
 Qian Weidao (684–685)
 Wei Siqian (685–686)
 Pei Judao (685)
 Wei Fangzhi (685–690)
 Wei Daijia (685–686)
 Su Liangsi (686–690)
 Wang Benli (689–690)
 Wang Xiaojie (694–696)
 Wu Sansi (697, 705)
 Doulu Qinwang (697–698, 699–700)
 Wu Youning (698–699)
 Wei Yuanzhong (701–703, 705)
 Su Weidao (702–704)
 Li Jiongxiu (702–704)
 Wei Anshi (702–704)
 Wei Sili (704, 709–710)
 Li Jiao (704, 706–707, 709–710)
 Yao Chong (704–705, 710, 713)
 Li Dan (705)
 Zhang Jianzhi (705)
 Yuan Shuji (705)
 Yang Zaisi (705, 709)
 Zhu Qinming (705–706)
 Wei Anshi (705, 711)
 Li Huaiyuan (705–706, 706)
 Tang Xiujing (705, 709–710)
 Wei Juyuan (705, 706–707, 709–710)
 Zong Chuke (707–709)
 Ji Chuna (707)
 Xiao Zhizhong (707–709)
 Zhang Renyuan (708–710)
 Wei Wen (709–710)
 Su Gui (709–710)
 Zhang Xi (710)
 Pei Tan (710)
 Li Longji (710)
 Song Jing (710–711)
 Wei Zhigu (711–712)
 Cui Shi (711–712, 712–713)
 Lu Xiangxian (712–713)
 Dou Huaizhen (712, 712–713)
 Cen Xi (712)
 Liu Youqiu (712, 713)
 Guo Yuanzhen (713)
 Xue Na (714)
 Zhang Shuo (721–723)
 Wang Jun (723)
 Li Linfu (734–736)
 Niu Xianke (736–738)
 Li Lin (757–758)

 Chancellors de facto of the second grade 
The office was created in 682. The titles, as modified from time to time to reflect the names in changes of the legislative and examination bureaus, included:
 Tong Zhongshu Menxia Pingzhangshi (同中書門下平章事) (682–684)
 Tong Fengge Luantai Pingzhangshi (同鳳閣鸞臺平章事) (684–705)
 Tong Zhongshu Menxia Pingzhangshi (705–713)
 Tong Ziwei Huangmen Pingzhangshi (同紫微黃門平章事) (713–720)
 Tong Zhongshu Menxia Pingzhangshi (720–907)

It was often referred to in brief as Tong Pingzhangshi (同平章事).

 Guo Daiju (682–683)
 Cen Changqian (682–683)
 Guo Zhengyi (682–683)
 Wei Xuantong (682–683)
 Liu Jingxian (682–683)
 Li Jingchen (684)
 Shen Junliang (684–685)
 Cui Cha (684–685)
 Wei Fangzhi (684–685)
 Zhang Guangfu (687–689)
 Qian Weidao (688)
 Wang Benli (688–689)
 Fan Lübing (689–690)
 Xing Wenwei (689–690)
 Fu Youyi (690–691)
 Le Sihui (691)
 Ren Zhigu (691–692)
 Ge Fuyuan (691)
 Pei Xingben (691–692)
 Di Renjie (691–692, 697–698)
 Yang Zhirou (692)
 Li Youdao (692)
 Yuan Zhihong (692)
 Cui Shenji (692)
 Cui Yuanzong (692–694)
 Li Zhaode (692–694)
 Yao Shu (692)
 Li Yuansu (692, 694–696)
 Wang Xuan (692)
 Lou Shide (693–696, 697)
 Wei Juyuan (693–694)
 Lu Yuanfang (693–694, 699–700)
 Su Weidao (694–694, 698–704)
 Wei Shifang (694)
 Yang Zaisi (694–699)
 Du Jingjian (694, 697–698)
 Zhou Yunyuan (694–695)
 Sun Yuanheng (696–696)
 Wang Fangqing (696–698)
 Li Daoguang (696–698)
 Zong Chuke (697–698, 704)
 Doulu Qinwang (697–698, 705–709)
 Yao Chong (698–704)
 Li Jiao (698–700, 703)
 Ji Xu (699–700)
 Wei Yuanzhong (699–701)
 Wang Jishan (699)
 Zhang Xi (700–701)
 Wei Anshi (700–704)
 Li Huaiyuan (701)
 Gu Cong (701–702)
 Li Jiongxiu (701–702)
 Zhu Jingze (703–704)
 Tang Xiujing (703–705)
 Cui Xuanwei (704–705)
 Zhang Jianzhi (704–705)
 Fang Rong (704–705)
 Wei Chengqing (704–705)
 Yuan Shuji (705)
 Yu Weiqian (706–707)
 Cui Shi (709, 710)
 Zhao Yanzhao (709–710)
 Zheng Yin (709)
 Cen Xi (710)
 Zhang Jiafu (710)
 Guo Yuanzhen (711)
 Zhang Shuo (711)
 Dou Huaizhen (711)
 Lu Xiangxian (711–712)
 Lu Huaishen (713–715)
 Yuan Qianyao (716, 720)
 Su Ting (716–720)
 Zhang Jiazhen (720)
 Li Yuanhong (726–729)
 Du Xian (726–729)
 Xiao Song (728–729)
 Pei Guangting (729–730)
 Yuwen Rong (729)
 Zhang Jiuling (733)
 Han Xiu (733)
 Chen Xilie (746–747)
 Wei Jiansu (754–757)
 Cui Yuan (756–757)
 Fang Guan (756–757)
 Pei Mian (756–757, 769)
 Cui Huan (756–757)
 Li Lin (756–757)
 Zhang Gao (757–758)
 Miao Jinqing (757)
 Wang Yu (758–759)
 Lü Yin (759, 759–760)
 Li Xian (759, 763–764)
 Li Kui (759–761)
 Diwu Qi (759)
 Xiao Hua (761–762)
 Pei Zunqing (761–763)
 Yuan Zai (762–777)
 Liu Yan (763–764)
 Wang Jin (764–777)
 Du Hongjian (764–769)
 Yang Wan (777)
 Chang Gun (777–779)
 Li Zhongchen (779–784)
 Cui Youfu (779–780)
 Qiao Lin (779)
 Yang Yan (779–781)
 Lu Qi (781–783)
 Zhang Yi (781–782)
 Guan Bo (782–784)
 Xiao Fu (783–784)
 Liu Congyi (783–785)
 Jiang Gongfu (783–784)
 Lu Han (784–786)
 Li Mian (784–786)
 Zhang Yanshang (785, 787)
 Liu Zi (786–787)
 Cui Zao (786)
 Qi Ying (786–787)
 Han Huang (786–787)
 Liu Hun (787)
 Li Mi (787–789)
 Dou Can (789–792)
 Dong Jin (789–793)
 Zhao Jing (792–796)
 Lu Zhi (792–794)
 Jia Dan (793–805)
 Lu Mai (793–797)
 Cui Sun (796–803)
 Zhao Zongru (796–798)
 Zheng Yuqing (798–800, 805–806)
 Qi Kang (800–803)
 Du You (803–812)
 Gao Ying (803–805)
 Zheng Xunyu (803–805)
 Wei Zhiyi (805)
 Du Huangchang (805–807)
 Yuan Zi (805)
 Zheng Yin (805–809)
 Wu Yuanheng (807, 813–815)
 Li Jifu (807–808, 811–814)
 Yu Di (808–813)
 Pei Ji (808–810)
 Li Fan (809–811)
 Quan Deyu (810–813)
 Li Jiang (811–814)
 Zhang Hongjing (814–816)
 Wei Guanzhi (814–816)
 Pei Du (815–819, 822, 826–830)
 Li Fengji (816–817, 822–826)
 Wang Ya (816–818, 833–835)
 Cui Qun (817–819)
 Li Yong (817–818)
 Li Yijian (818)
 Huangfu Bo (818–820)
 Cheng Yi (818–819)
 Linghu Chu (819–820)
 Xiao Mian (820–821)
 Duan Wenchang (820–821)
 Cui Zhi (820–822)
 Du Yuanying (821–823)
 Wang Bo (821–822, 827–830)
 Yuan Zhen (822)
 Niu Sengru (823–825, 830–832)
 Li Cheng (824–826)
 Dou Yizhi (824–828)
 Wei Chuhou (826–828)
 Lu Sui (828–835)
 Li Zongmin (829–833, 834–835)
 Song Shenxi (830–831)
 Li Deyu (833–834, 840–846)
 Jia Su (835)
 Li Guyan (835, 836–837)
 Shu Yuanyu (835)
 Li Xun (835)
 Zheng Tan (835–839)
 Li Shi (835–838)
 Chen Yixing (837–839, 841–842)
 Yang Sifu (838–840)
 Li Jue (838–840)
 Cui Dan (839–841)
 Cui Gong (840–843)
 Li Shen (842–844)
 Li Rangyi (842–846)
 Cui Xuan (843–845, 849–855)
 Du Cong (844–845, 861–863)
 Li Hui (Tang dynasty) (845–846)
 Zheng Su (845–846)
 Bai Minzhong (846–851)
 Lu Shang (846–847)
 Cui Yuanshi (847–848)
 Wei Cong (847–848)
 Ma Zhi (848–849)
 Zhou Chi (848–849)
 Wei Fu (849–850)
 Cui Guicong (850–851)
 Linghu Tao (850–859)
 Wei Mo (851–857)
 Pei Xiu (852–856)
 Zheng Lang (856–857)
 Cui Shenyou (856–858)
 Xiao Ye (857–859)
 Liu Zhuan (858)
 Xiahou Zi (858–860, 862–864)
 Jiang Shen (858–862)
 Du Shenquan (859–863)
 Bi Xian (860–863)
 Yang Shou (863–866)
 Cao Que (863–870)
 Xiao Zhi (864–865)
 Lu Yan (864–871)
 Gao Qu (865)
 Xu Shang (865–869)
 Yu Cong (867–872)
 Liu Zhan (869–870, 874)
 Wei Baoheng (870–873)
 Wang Duo (870–873, 877–879)
 Liu Ye (871–874)
 Zhao Yin (872–874)
 Xiao Fang (873–875)
 Pei Tan (874)
 Cui Yanzhao (874–877)
 Zheng Tian (874–878, 882–883)
 Lu Xi (874–878, 879–880)
 Li Wei (875–878)
 Doulu Zhuan (878–880)
 Cui Hang (878–880)
 Zheng Congdang (878–880, 883–886)
 Wang Hui (880–881)
 Pei Che (880–881, 883–887)
 Xiao Gou (881–887)
 Zheng Changtu (886)
 Wei Zhaodu (881–887, 893–895)
 Kong Wei (886–891, 895)
 Du Rangneng (886–893)
 Zhang Jun (887–891)
 Liu Chongwang (889–892)
 Cui Zhaowei (891–895)
 Xu Yanruo (891–893, 894–900)
 Zheng Yanchang (892–894)
 Cui Yin (893–895, 895–896, 896–899, 900–901, 903–904)
 Zheng Qi (894)
 Li Xi (894, 895)
 Lu Xisheng (895)
 Wang Tuan (895–896, 896–900)
 Sun Wo (895–897)
 Lu Yi (896, 899–903)
 Zhu Pu (896–897)
 Cui Yuan (896–900, 904–905)
 Pei Zhi (900–903)
 Wang Pu (901–903)
 Pei Shu (901, 903–905)
 Wei Yifan (902, 902)
 Su Jian (902–903)
 Dugu Sun (903–905)
 Liu Can (904–905)
 Zhang Wenwei (905–907)
 Yang She (905–907)

 Chancellors de facto of the third grade 
The office recurred as variations of the pre-formalization titles, even after formalization of the chancellors de facto offices of the first and second grades, but did not regularly recur after 713. Liu Youqiu, who held the title as Zhi Junguo Zhongshi, was the last person to hold any variation of the title as chancellor as a regular title, although Pei Du would hold the title of Pingzhang Junguo Zhongshi (平章軍國重事) briefly in 830. Toward the end of the dynasty, Li Zhirou was briefly put temporarily in charge of the Office of the Chancellors in 895 with the designation Quanzhi Zhongshu Shi (權知中書事) and therefore could be regarded as a chancellor as well (and was listed in the table of chancellors in the New Book of Tang); similarly, Lu Guangqi went through two similar titles.

 Zhang Liang (643–646) (as Canyu Chaozheng (參豫朝政))
 Chu Suiliang (644–647, 648) (as Canyu Chaozheng)
 Xu Jingzong (645) (as Tongzhang Jiwu (同掌機務))
 Gao Jifu (645) (as Tongzhang Jiwu)
 Zhang Xingcheng (645) (as Tongzhang Jiwu)
 Cui Renshi (648) (as Canzhi Jiwu (參知機務))
 Li Yifu (655–657) (as Canzhi Zhengshi (參知政事))
 Lu Chengqing (659) (as Canzhi Zhengshi)
 Le Yanwei (665) (as Zhi Junguo Zhengshi (知軍國政事))
 Sun Chuyue (665) (as Zhi Junguo Zhengshi)
 Liu Rengui (665–666) (as Zhi Zhengshi (知政事))
 Zhang Wenguan (667–669) (as Canzhi Zhengshi)
 Li Dan (710) (as Canmou Zhengshi (參謀政事))
 Liu Youqiu (710–711 (as Canyu Jiwu (參豫機務)), 713 (as Zhi Junguo Zhongshi (知軍國重事)))
 Zhong Shaojing (710) (as Canyu Jiwu)
 Xue Ji (710) (as Canyu Jiwu)
 Cui Riyong (710) (as Canyu Jiwu)
 Dou Huaizhen (712) (as Junguo Zhongshi Yigong Pingzhang (軍國重事宜共平章))
 Pei Du (830) (as Pingzhang Junguo Zhongshi)
 Li Zhirou (895) as Quanzhi Zhongshu Shi (權知中書事)
 Lu Guangqi (901 (as Quanju Dang Zhongshu Shi (權句當中書事)), 901–902 (as Canzhi Jiwu))

 See also 
 Prime Minister of the Imperial Cabinet
 Grand chancellor (China)

 References 

 Generally 
 Old Book of Tang, vols. 42, 43.
 New Book of Tang, vols. 46, 47, 61 , 62, 63.
 Bo Yang Edition of the Zizhi Tongjian, vol. 45, pp. 217–269.
 Bo Yang, Outlines of the History of the Chinese'' (中國人史綱), vol. 2, pp. 499–503.

Specifically